Love Is Blind is a 1925 German silent comedy film directed by Lothar Mendes and starring Lil Dagover, Conrad Veidt and Lillian Hall-Davis. It was shot at the Babelsberg Studios in Berlin. The film's sets were designed by Hans Jacoby. It was produced and distributed by UFA, Germany's largest film company of the Weimar Era.

Cast
 Lil Dagover as Diane
 Conrad Veidt as Dr. Lamare
 Lillian Hall-Davis as Evelyn
 Georg Alexander as Viktor
 Emil Jannings as Emil Jannings
 Jenny Jugo as Medium
 Jack Trevor as Filmregisseur
 Alexander Murski

References

Bibliography
 Hans-Michael Bock and Tim Bergfelder. The Concise Cinegraph: An Encyclopedia of German Cinema. Berghahn Books.

External links

1925 films
1925 comedy films
German comedy films
Films of the Weimar Republic
Films directed by Lothar Mendes
German silent feature films
UFA GmbH films
Films produced by Erich Pommer
Films about hypnosis
German black-and-white films
Silent comedy films
Films shot at Babelsberg Studios
1920s German films